Harper School, also known as Harper Community Building, is a historic one-room school located at Harper, St. Clair County, Missouri. It was built about 1875, and is a one-story, one-room frame schoolhouse with twin entrances.  It measures 20 feet wide by 32 feet long and has a gable roof with shed roof porch.  Also on the property is a contributing frame privy (1935).  The school closed in 1952 and houses a community centre.

It was added to the National Register of Historic Places in 2007.

References

One-room schoolhouses in Missouri
School buildings on the National Register of Historic Places in Missouri
School buildings completed in 1875
Buildings and structures in St. Clair County, Missouri
National Register of Historic Places in St. Clair County, Missouri